State Road 374 (NM 374) is a  state highway in the US state of New Mexico. NM 374's eastern terminus is at NM 372 in Mesilla, and the western terminus is at Mesilla Dam.

Major intersections

See also

References

374
Transportation in Doña Ana County, New Mexico